Ugly Duckling Presse is an American nonprofit art and publishing collective based in Brooklyn, New York City founded in 1993 by Matvei Yankelevich as a college zine. It publishes poetry, translations, lost works, and artist's books.  A micro press, the company uses subscriptions, and gathered its early audience with guerrilla marketing techniques.

History
Ugly Duckling Presse is an American nonprofit art and publishing collective located in Brooklyn, New York City, founded in 1993 by Matvei Yankelevich as a college zine 
In 1995, it expanded to publishing other works and in 2000 it took shape as a collective.
A micro press, the company uses distribution methods not traditionally seen in publishing, such as subscriptions, and gathered its early audience with guerrilla marketing techniques.

Publications
Ugly Duckling Presse (UDP) focuses on new, international, and "forgotten" writers and specializes in projects which may be difficult to produce at other presses. Formats produced include full-length books, chapbooks, and broadsides. These formats, along with UDP's magazine and newspaper, all contain handmade elements. The Presse states that these, "call attention to the labor and history of bookmaking".

Past publications include Nets by Jen Bervin, erasure poetry of Shakespeare's sonnets, Poker by Tomaž Šalamun (which was a finalist for the PEN Award for Poetry in Translation) and works by New York-based writers Steve Dalachinsky and Lewis Warsh.  The Presse also publishes a regular series of translations of Eastern European poetry.  Publications include works by Czech poet Ivan Blatný and Russian conceptualists Dmitri Prigov and Lev Rubinstein. In 2020, UDP published their Pamphlet Series, which Cleveland Review of Books called it "rigorously ephemeral, resolutely partial."

As of 2007, Ugly Duckling Presse also created "paperless" works in collaboration with various visual and performance artists. These may be performed, or produced through media such as digital video, CD, or tree bark.

Premises and personnel
The Presse maintains a workshop and letterpress studio in the Gowanus neighborhood in the industrial complex of The Old American Can Factory on the Fourth Street Basin of the Gowanus Canal in Brooklyn. Its current editors, as of 2021, are Katherine Bogden, Yelena Gluzman, Chuck Kuan, Anna Moschovakis, Michael Newton, Daniel Owen, Emmalea Russo, Kyra Simone, Rebekah Smith, and Matvei Yankelevich. 

Past editors are Abraham Adams, David Jou, Phil Cordelli, G. L. Ford, Ellie Ga, Ryan Haley, James Hoff, Marisol Limon Martinez, Filip Marinovich, Julien Poirier, Linda Trimbath, and Genya Turovskaya.

See also
 Futurepoem Books

References

External links
Ugly Duckling Presse
Ugly Duckling Presse in The New York Times
Interview with Ugly Duckling Presse
Ugly Duckling Presse in The Brooklyn Rail

Book publishing companies based in New York City
Publishing collectives 
Publishing companies established in 1993 
Poetry organizations 
Literary editors
1993 establishments in New York City